Spálov is a market town in Nový Jičín District in the Moravian-Silesian Region of the Czech Republic. It has about 900 inhabitants.

History
The first written mention of Spálov is from 1394. The village was promoted to a market town in 1828.

References

Market towns in the Czech Republic